Eupithecia necessaria is a moth in the family Geometridae. It is found in Mongolia.

References

Moths described in 1977
necessaria
Moths of Asia